Portuguese in Sweden are citizens and residents of Sweden who are of Portuguese descent. There are approximately 4,336 people born in Portugal living in Sweden today.

References

Portuguese
Portuguese
 
Sweden
Portuguese diaspora in Europe